The Amberjack Hole is a blue hole located  off the coast of Sarasota, Florida.

Exploration 
As part of a three-year study, a group of scientists set out in May and September 2019 to explore the region. Individuals from Mote Marine Laboratory, Florida Atlantic University, Harbor Branch, Georgia Institute of Technology, the United States Geological Survey, and the NOAA Office of Ocean Exploration participated in the expedition. The expedition gathered information about life around and within the hole, seawater composition, and the hole's bottom sediments. Scientists found evidence of nutrient flux moving up from the bottom of the hole, indicating food sources are traveling up as well as descending down into the hole. They also found isotopes of radium and radon, common in groundwater indicating there may be a connection between the Floridan aquifer and the bottom of the hole.

See also 
 Green Banana Hole
 Marine geology
 Oceanography
 Physical oceanography

References

External links 
 PBS Changing Seas: Episode 1201: Florida's Blue Holes: Oases in the SeaEpisode

Cave geology
Landforms of the Gulf of Mexico
Marine geology
.Blue
Sinkholes of Florida
Underwater diving sites in the United States